John Rennie may refer to:
 John Rennie the Elder (1761–1821), engineer (factories, canals, design of London Bridge)
 Sir John Rennie the Younger (1794–1874), engineer (rail lines, completion of London Bridge)
 John Rennie (naval architect) (1842–1918), naval architect
 Sir John Rennie (MI6 officer) (1914–1981), Director of MI6
 John Rennie (soccer) (born c. 1944), American soccer coach
 John Rennie (editor) (born 1959), editor-in-chief of Scientific American, 1994–2009
 John Rennie (cricketer) (born 1970), Zimbabwean Test and ODI cricketer
 John Gillies Rennie (1904–1952), Quebec politician and educator
John Rennie High School, Quebec, Canada, named for John Gillies Rennie
 John Rennie (GC) (1920–1943), British recipient of the George Cross
 John Shaw Rennie (1917–2002), Commissioner-General of UNRWA
 John T. Rennie (1824–1878), Scottish ship-owner
 John Rennie Short (born 1951), Scottish geographer and public policy academic